Oba Otudeko CFR is a Nigerian businessman who serves as the founder and chairman of the Honeywell Group. He was a former chairman of FBN Holdings and founder of the Oba Otudeko Foundation. As of June 2017, his estimated net worth was US$550 million.

Early life and education 
Ayoola Oba Otudeko was born in Ibadan, Oyo State, South-West Nigeria on 18 August 1943 to a royal family, thus making him an Omoba of the Yoruba people. His mother was a business woman. He studied at St. John's School,Oke Agbo, Ijebu-Igbo in Ogun State, and Olivet Baptist High School, Oyo. Later, he studied Accountancy at the Leeds College of Commerce Leeds, Yorkshire, United Kingdom (which is now part of the Leeds Beckett University). Professionally, Oba Otudeko is a Chartered Banker, Chartered Accountant and a Chartered Corporate Secretary.

Oba Otudeko has also attended executive management training programmes at International Institute for Management Development (IMD), Harvard Business School and Hult International Business School (then known as Arthur D. Little School of Management).

Career

Banking career
Oba Otudeko was in bank employment for 23 years, rising to become the General Manager and acting Chief Executive Officer of then Cooperative Bank, Ibadan. He retired from the bank in 1983. The Federal government of Nigeria appointed him a Director to the Board of the Central Bank of Nigeria.

Honeywell Group 
In the 1970s, Oba Otudeko founded Honeywell Enterprises. The trading enterprise company later grew into Honeywell Group, a diversified industrial, trading and investment conglomerate.

Achievements and awards 
Oba Otudeko was elected the 16th President of the Nigerian Stock Exchange in September 2006, and tried to transform the Nigerian capital market.  In addition to the Honeywell Group, Oba Otudeko was also Chairman of FBN Holdings Plc and has, at various points, been Chairman of Airtel Nigeria Limited and Fan Milk of Nigeria Plc. He was on the Board of First Bank of Nigeria Plc for 12 years, retiring as the Chairman in 2010. He has also held directorship positions in private companies operating in real estate, international trade and finance, and brewing, including Guinness Nigeria and Ecobank Transnational Inc.

Oba Otudeko was Chairman of the Nigerian-South African Chamber of Commerce (NSACC) and aimed to facilitate investment flows into Nigeria. During his tenure as the NSACC Chairman, the volume of Nigeria-South Africa bilateral trade grew significantly from $16.5 million in 1999 to $2.9 billion in 2010. He was also on the Board of the NEPAD Business Group – Nigeria.

He was Chairman of the Business Support Group (BSG) for delivery of the National Integrated Infrastructure Master Plan (NIIMP). In 2013, he was also appointed the chairman of the Digital Africa Conference Exhibition in Abuja, Nigeria

From 2001 to 2010, he was Chancellor of the Olabisi Onabanjo University, Ago-Iwoye, Ogun State

Oba Otudeko's awards include: Honorary Doctor of Science (D.Sc.) from Olabisi Onabanjo University, Ago-Iwoye. Honorary Doctor of Science in Banking and Finance from Crescent University, Abeokuta, Ogun State. Honorary Doctor of Science Degree (D.Sc.) from Ajayi Crowther University, Oyo Town, Oyo State;. Entrepreneur of the Year Award at the ThisDay Awards in 2009. Ernst & Young Lifetime Achievement Award; Leadership Newspaper Business Person of the Year 2015; Silverbird Extraordinary Lifetime Achievement Award and recently, the 2016 Africa CEO Forum's Africa CEO of the Year Award.

Personal life 
He is married to Mrs Adebisi Aderonke Otudeko and he is the founder of the Oba Otudeko Foundation.

References

Living people
1943 births
Yoruba bankers
Yoruba businesspeople
Commanders of the Order of the Federal Republic
Harvard Business School alumni
Hult International Business School alumni
Alumni of London Business School
21st-century Nigerian businesspeople
Nigerian investors
Businesspeople from Ibadan
Yoruba royalty
Alumni of Leeds Beckett University
Olabisi Onabanjo University people
Nigerian company founders
Nigerian chairpersons of corporations